The 2009–10 season of the Hoofdklasse was competed in six leagues, three Saturday leagues and three Sunday leagues. The Champions, second, third and fourth of each group promoted direct to the new Topklasse.

Saturday A

Saturday B

Saturday C

Sunday A

Sunday B

Sunday C

Championship

Saturday championship

Sunday championship

Final

Topklasse Playoffs

Round 1

For promotion to Topklasse Saturday

For promotion to Topklasse Sunday

Round 2

Group 1

Group 2

Round 3

References

 soccerway.com
 www.knvb.nl

Vierde Divisie seasons
Neth
4